Olifants River is a river in the Klein Karoo area of the Western Cape, South Africa.

Course
It has its origins in the Traka and Kalkwal Rivers north of the Swartberg, becoming the Olifants River after flowing through the Toorwaterpoort, flowing west through Oudtshoorn and joining the Gamka River to form the Gourits River, then heading south to its mouth at Gouritsmond in the southern coast of the Western Cape.

The northern tributaries of the Olifants River rise in the Great Karoo to the north of the Swartberg Mountains, while the Olifants River itself rises to the east and flows westwards between the Swartberg and Kammanassie mountains to its confluence with the Gamka River. The southern slopes of the Swartberg Mountains are drained by the perennial Groot River, Kango River, Grobbelaars River, Wynands River, Kansa River and Vlei River tributaries, which flow into the Olifants River. The Kammanassie River rises in the Outeniqua and Kammanassie mountains near Uniondale and joins the Olifants River upstream of Oudtshoorn.

Dams in the Olifants River 
 Stompdrift Dam (capacity ), 
 Kammanassie Dam (capacity ), 
 Koos Raubenheimer (capacity ),
 Melville Dam (capacity ).

See also 
 List of rivers of South Africa

References 

Rivers of the Western Cape